French legislative elections took place on 5 and 12 March 1967 to elect the third National Assembly of the Fifth Republic.

In December 1965, Charles de Gaulle was re-elected President of France in the first Presidential election by universal suffrage. However, contrary to predictions, there had been a second ballot. This election marked a process of rebuilding by the opposition.

François Mitterrand's unexpected result, as De Gaulle's challenger in the second round of the presidential election, allowed him to establish himself as the leader of the non-Communist Left. He led the Federation of the Democratic and Socialist Left (FGDS), composed of the French Section of the Workers' International (SFIO, socialist party), the Radical Party and several left-wing republican clubs, which concluded an electoral agreement with the French Communist Party (PCF).

The centrist and right-wing opposition to de Gaulle gathered in the Democratic Centre led by Jean Lecanuet, the "third man" of 1965 presidential election. However some centrists refused to integrate into this group and joined the Gaullist Party, which became the Union of Democrats for the Fifth Republic (UD5)

Prime Minister Georges Pompidou led the campaign of the incumbent majority, but this was divided. In January 1966, a cabinet reshuffle took place. The Independent Republicans (RI) leader and Economy minister Valéry Giscard d'Estaing was dismissed from the cabinet. His group stayed in the Presidential Majority but with a more critical position. He summed up this attitude by a "yes, but..." to Gaullist policies.

The result of the first round was perceived as a punishment against the Presidential Majority, which obtained a surprisingly low result. The outcome of the second round depended on the centrist voters. The Gaullists warned voters against a return to the Fourth Republic, political instability and "Communist danger". The alliance between centrists and the candidates of the Presidential Majority in some constituencies explained the victory of the Right in the second round.

The Left improved in comparison with the previous legislative election and the Presidential Majority won with only a one-seat majority. The centrist deputies were not numerous enough numerous to force the Gaullists to make compromises. Georges Pompidou was confirmed as Prime Minister of a UDR-RI cabinet.

Results 

|-
! style="background-color:#E9E9E9;text-align:left;vertical-align:top;" rowspan=2 colspan=3 width=600 |Parties and coalitions
! style="background-color:#E9E9E9;text-align:center;" colspan=2 |1st round
! style="background-color:#E9E9E9;text-align:center;" colspan=2 |2nd round
! style="background-color:#E9E9E9" rowspan=2|Total seats
|-
! style="background-color:#E9E9E9;text-align:right;" |Votes
! style="background-color:#E9E9E9;text-align:right;" |%
! style="background-color:#E9E9E9;text-align:right;" |Votes
! style="background-color:#E9E9E9;text-align:right;" |%
|-
|style="background-color:#0000C8"| 
| style="text-align:left;" | Union of Democrats for the Fifth Republic – Independent Republicans
Union of Democrats for the Fifth Republic (Union des démocrates pour la Cinquième République) 
Independent Republicans (Républicains indépendants)
| style="text-align:right;" | UDVeR-RI
| style="text-align:right;" | 8,448,082
| style="text-align:right;" | 37.73
| style="text-align:right;" | 7,972,908
| style="text-align:right;" | 42.60
| style="text-align:right;" | 243
201
42
|-
|style="background-color:#00CCCC"| 
| style="text-align:left;" | Democratic Centre (Centre démocrate)
| style="text-align:right;" | CD
| style="text-align:right;" | 2,829,995
| style="text-align:right;" | 12.64
| style="text-align:right;" | 1,328,777
| style="text-align:right;" | 7.10
| style="text-align:right;" | 41
|-
|style="background-color:#4C4CB0"|
| style="text-align:left;" | Miscellaneous Right
| style="text-align:right;" | DVD
| style="text-align:right;" | 1,140,748
| style="text-align:right;" | 5.10
| style="text-align:right;" | 702,352
| style="text-align:right;" | 3.73
| style="text-align:right;" | 9
|- style="background-color:lightblue"
| style="text-align:left;" colspan=2|Total Right ("Presidential Majority" and CD)
|
| style="text-align:right;" | 12,418,825
| style="text-align:right;" | 55.47
| style="text-align:right;" | 10,004,037
| style="text-align:right;" | 53.43
| style="text-align:right;" | 293
|-
|style="background-color:#FF0000"|
| style="text-align:left;" | French Communist Party (Parti communiste français)
| style="text-align:right;" | PCF
| style="text-align:right;" | 5,039,032
| style="text-align:right;" | 22.51
| style="text-align:right;" | 3,998,790
| style="text-align:right;" | 21.37
| style="text-align:right;" | 73
|-
|style="background-color:#E75480"|
| style="text-align:left;" | Federation of the Democratic and Socialist Left (Fédération de la gauche démocrate et socialiste)
| style="text-align:right;" | FGDS
| style="text-align:right;" | 4,224,110
| style="text-align:right;" | 18.96
| style="text-align:right;" | 4,505,329
| style="text-align:right;" | 24.08
| style="text-align:right;" | 117
|-
|style="background-color:#DE3163"|
| style="text-align:left;" | Unified Socialist Party (Parti socialiste unifié) 
| style="text-align:right;" | PSU
| style="text-align:right;" | 495,412
| style="text-align:right;" | 2.21
| style="text-align:right;" | 173,466
| style="text-align:right;" | 0.93
| style="text-align:right;" | 4
|- style="background-color:pink"
| style="text-align:left;" colspan=2|Total Left
|
| style="text-align:right;" | 9,758,554
| style="text-align:right;" | 43.68 
| style="text-align:right;" | 8,677,585
| style="text-align:right;" | 46.38 
| style="text-align:right;" | 194
|-
|style="background-color:#704214"|
| style="text-align:left;" | Republican Alliance for the Progress and Liberties (Alliance républicaine pour le progrès et les libertés)
| style="text-align:right;" | ARPL
| style="text-align:right;" | 191,232
| style="text-align:right;" | 0.85
| style="text-align:right;" | 28,347
| style="text-align:right;" | 0.15
| style="text-align:right;" | -
|-
|
| style="text-align:left;" | Total
|
| style="text-align:right;" | 22,389,514
| style="text-align:right;" | 100.00
| style="text-align:right;" | 18,333,791
| style="text-align:right;" | 100.00
| style="text-align:right;" | 487
|-
| style="text-align:left;" colspan=8 | Abstention: 19.08% (1st round); 31.27% (2nd round)
|}

National Assembly by Parliamentary Group

One seat vacant (Côte française des Somalis)

1967
Legislative election
French legislative election